The Quietus is a British online music and pop culture magazine founded by John Doran and Luke Turner. The site is an editorially independent publication led by Doran with a group of freelance journalists and critics.

Content 
The Quietus primarily features writings on music and film, as well as interviews with a wide range of notable artists and musicians. The magazine also occasionally includes pieces on literature, graphic novels, architecture, and TV series. The website is edited by John Doran, who claims that it caters for "the intelligent music fan between the age of 21 and, well, 73". Its staff list includes former writers for publications such as Melody Maker, Select, NME and Q, including journalist David Stubbs, BBC Radio 1 DJ Steve Lamacq, Professor Simon Frith and Simon Price among others.

Among its best known columns is its "Baker's Dozen," in which artists select 13 personal favourite albums. Content from the site's interviews have been used by other national and international media outlets. The site's news has been cited by publications from Russia to Brazil and Indonesia. The Quietus also organises independent music gigs in tandem with entertainment venues.

Accolades 
In 2008, The Quietus won Student Publication Choice at the Record of the Day Awards. In 2009, the site won Best Digital Publication at the same awards ceremony, where Doran won Live Review Writer of the Year. The same year, it was chosen as one of The 25 Best Music Websites by The Independent.

References

External links 

Metallica v. The Quietus at Citizen Media Law Project

2008 establishments in the United Kingdom
British blogs
British entertainment websites
British film websites
British music websites
British review websites
Internet properties established in 2008
Magazines established in 2008
Music blogs
Music magazines
Music review websites
Online music magazines published in the United Kingdom